These were the late night schedules on all three networks for each calendar season beginning at September 1965. All times are Eastern/Pacific.

NET is not included, as member television stations have local flexibility over most of their schedules and broadcast times for network shows may vary, ABC is not included on the weekend schedules (as the network do not offer late night programs of any kind on weekends).

Talk/Variety shows are highlighted in yellow, Local News & Programs are highlighted in white.

Monday-Friday

Saturday/Sunday

By network

ABC

Returning Series
ABC's Nightlife with Les Crane

Not returning from 1964-65
The Les Crane Show
ABC's Nightlife

NBC

Returning Series
The Saturday/Sunday Tonight Show
The Tonight Show Starring Johnny Carson

United States late night network television schedules
1965 in American television
1966 in American television